Liquiritigenin is a flavanone that was isolated from Glycyrrhiza uralensis, and is found in a variety of plants, including Glycyrrhiza glabra (licorice). It is an estrogenic compound which acts as a selective agonist of the ERβ subtype of the estrogen receptor (ER), though it is also reported to act as an ERα partial agonist at sufficient concentrations. It also has a choleretic effect.

Liquiritigenin,NADPH:oxygen oxidoreductase (hydroxylating, aryl migration) is an enzyme that uses liquiritigenin, O2, NADPH and H+ to produce 2,7,4'-trihydroxyisoflavanone, H2O, and NADP+.

See also
 Menerba
 Prinaberel (ERB-041)
 Diarylpropionitrile (DPN)
 WAY-200070
 PHTPP
 (R,R)-Tetrahydrochrysene ((R,R)-THC)
 Propylpyrazoletriol (PPT)
 Methylpiperidinopyrazole (MPP)

References

Aromatase inhibitors
Phytoestrogens
Flavanones
Selective ERβ agonists